Cordyline is a genus of about 24 species of woody monocotyledonous flowering plants in family Asparagaceae, subfamily Lomandroideae. The subfamily has previously been treated as a separate family Laxmanniaceae, or Lomandraceae. Other authors have placed the genus in the Agavaceae (now Agavoideae). Cordyline is native to the western Pacific Ocean region, from New Zealand, eastern Australia, southeastern Asia and Polynesia, with one species found in southeastern South America.

The name Cordyline comes from the Greek word kordyle, meaning "club," a reference to the enlarged underground stems or rhizomes.

Species
, the World Checklist of Selected Plant Families accepted 24 species:
 Cordyline angustissima K.Schum. – New Guinea
 Cordyline australis (G.Forst.) Endl. (Cabbage Tree) – New Zealand
 Cordyline banksii Hook.f. (syn. C. diffusa Colenso.) – New Zealand
 Cordyline cannifolia R.Br. – Australia: N.E. Northern Territory, N.E. Queensland
 Cordyline casanovae Linden ex André – Vanuatu
 Cordyline congesta (Sweet) Steud. (syn. C. dracaenoides Kunth) – Australia: S.E. Queensland to N.E. New South Wales
 Cordyline diffusa Colenso. (syn. C. banksii Hook.f.) – New Zealand
 Cordyline forbesii Rendle – Papua New Guinea
 Cordyline fruticosa (L.) A.Chev. – Papuasia to W. Pacific
 Cordyline indivisa (G.Forst.) Endl. (mountain cabbage tree) – New Zealand (syn. Cordyline hectori, Cordyline hookeri)
 Cordyline lateralis Lauterb. – New Guinea
 Cordyline ledermannii K.Krause – New Guinea
 Cordyline manners-suttoniae F.Muell. – Australia: N.E. Queensland
 Cordyline mauritiana (Lam.) J.F.Macbr. – Mascarenes
 Cordyline minutiflora Ridl. – New Guinea
 Cordyline murchisoniae F.Muell. (syn. C. haageana  K.Koch) – Australia: E. Queensland
 Cordyline neocaledonica (Baker) B.D.Jacks. – New Caledonia
 Cordyline obtecta (Graham) Baker – Norfolk Island, N. New Zealand North Island
 Cordyline petiolaris (Domin) Pedley – Australia: S.E. Queensland to N.E. New South Wales
 Cordyline pumilio Hook.f. – New Zealand North Island
 Cordyline racemosa Ridl. – New Guinea
 Cordyline rubra Otto & A.Dietr. – Australia: S.E. Queensland to N.E. New South Wales
 Cordyline schlechteri Lauterb. – New Guinea
 Cordyline sellowiana Kunth – Bolivia to Brazil and N. Argentina
 Cordyline stricta (Sims) Endl. – Australia: S.E. Queensland to N.E. New South Wales

Formerly placed here
Dracaena aletriformis (Haw.) Bos (as C. rumphii Hook.)
Dracaena elliptica Thunb. & Dalm. (as C. maculata (Roxb.) Planch. and C. sieboldii Planch.)
Dracaena fragrans (L.) Ker Gawl. (as C. fragrans (L.) Planch.)

Cultivation and uses
Members of the group are often grown as ornamental plants - notably C. australis and C. fruticosa. Many species have been used as a foodstuff and medicine,  for additional details on these and other uses see the article on C. australis. The rhizome was roasted in an hāngi (earth oven) by Māori to extract sugar.

In the highlands of Papua New Guinea. leaves of Cordyline and other plants are tied to sticks to mark taboo areas where pandanus language must be spoken during karuka harvest.

References

 
Asparagaceae genera
Taxa named by Robert Brown (botanist, born 1773)